Mitzi Martin (born December 27, 1967)  is an American actress and model, most notable for her roles in the films Harley Davidson and the Marlboro Man, Joe Dirt, Dude, Where's My Car?, and The Island. Her likeness and image were also used for the character Cate Archer in the computer game No One Lives Forever.

Career

Modeling 
Martin first came to prominence as a fashion model. Early in her career, she was signed to top agencies such as Marilyn Models in Paris, the now defunct Bethann Models in New York, and Elite Models Los Angeles. Martin has appeared in advertisements for Finesse Shampoo, L'oreal, Laise Adzer, Cutex, 000.1 studio by Ferre, and LA Eyeworks. She has also graced numerous magazine covers including Elle Spain, Vogue Germany, Elle Netherlands, Flare Magazine, Model, Moda Magazine, Estetica, and Harper's Bazaar. She is currently represented by Heffner Model Management in Seattle.

Acting 
After a successful career as a fashion model, Martin embarked on an acting career. In 1991, she made her first appearance in the feature film Harley Davidson and the Marlboro Man. It wasn't until 2000 that Martin focused her attention to acting appearing in films such as Dude, Where's my Car?, Joe Dirt, S1m0ne and The Island.

Personal life 
Currently, Martin is married to Josh Todd of Buckcherry and resides in Los Angeles with her children Willow and Jack.

References

External links

1967 births
Female models from California
Models from Los Angeles
American television actresses
American film actresses
Living people
Actresses from Los Angeles
American video game actresses
21st-century American women